Bernhard Gruber (born 12 August 1982) is an Austrian former nordic combined skier who has competed between 2003 and 2021.

Career
At the 2010 Winter Olympics, he won a gold in the 4 x 5 km team and a bronze in the 10 km individual large hill events.

At the FIS Nordic World Ski Championships 2009 in Liberec, Gruber finished fifth in the 4 x 5 km team, 11th in both the 10 km individual large hill and individual normal hill events, and 22nd in the 10 km mass start event.

He has seven World Cup victories in his career. His first wins came in 2008. One of these wins that year was in the 15 km individual event at the Holmenkollen ski festival in Oslo.

He retired in 2021 after his second heart surgery.

Record

Olympic Games
 4 medals – (1 gold, 3 bronze)

World Championship
 9 medals – (3 gold, 3 silver, 3 bronze)

References

External links

1982 births
Austrian male Nordic combined skiers
Holmenkollen Ski Festival winners
Living people
Nordic combined skiers at the 2010 Winter Olympics
Nordic combined skiers at the 2014 Winter Olympics
Nordic combined skiers at the 2018 Winter Olympics
Olympic Nordic combined skiers of Austria
Olympic gold medalists for Austria
Olympic bronze medalists for Austria
Olympic medalists in Nordic combined
FIS Nordic World Ski Championships medalists in Nordic combined
Medalists at the 2010 Winter Olympics
Medalists at the 2014 Winter Olympics
Medalists at the 2018 Winter Olympics
Universiade medalists in nordic combined
Universiade gold medalists for Austria
Competitors at the 2005 Winter Universiade